Svetlana Kuznetsova and Amélie Mauresmo were the defending champions, but Mauresmo retired from the sport on December 3, 2009.
Kuznetsova chose to compete with Alicia Molik, but they lost in the first round to Gisela Dulko and Flavia Pennetta. 
The unseeded pair Gisela Dulko and Flavia Pennetta won in the final 6–3, 4–6, [10–7], against Nadia Petrova and Samantha Stosur.

Seeds

  Cara Black /  Liezel Huber (first round)
  Nuria Llagostera Vives /  María José Martínez Sánchez (second round)
  Nadia Petrova /  Samantha Stosur (finals)
  Lisa Raymond /  Rennae Stubbs (semifinals)
  Alisa Kleybanova /  Francesca Schiavone (quarterfinals)
  Bethanie Mattek-Sands /  Yan Zi (first round)
  Chuang Chia-jung /  Hsieh Su-wei (first round)
  Ekaterina Makarova /  Peng Shuai (quarterfinals)

Draw

Finals

Top half

Bottom half

References
Doubles Draw

2010 WTA Tour
2010 Sony Ericsson Open
Women in Florida